The Potomac Handicap was an American Thoroughbred horse race run annually in the latter part of September at Havre de Grace Racetrack in Havre de Grace, Maryland. Open to three-year-old horses, it was raced on dirt at a distance of a mile-and-a-sixteenth.

First run at Laurel Park Racecourse in Laurel, Maryland, it was restricted to two-year-olds and run at a distance of one mile. The 1918 running was won by Calumet Farm's two-year-old colt, Be Frank, ridden by Lavelle Ensor.  The following year the race moved to the Havre de Grace Racetrack and was changed to an event for  three-year-olds and set at a distance of a mile-and-a-sixteenth.

The Potomac Handicap was won by four National Museum of Racing and Hall of Fame inductees including  1919 U.S. Triple Crown winner Sir Barton and Man o' War who won the 1920 edition. Despite being assigned highweight of 138 pounds, Man o' War set a new Havre de Grace track record for a mile-and-a-sixteenth.

Venue:
 Laurel : 1916-1918, 1944-1948
 Pimlico: 1943
 Havre de Grace Racetrack: 1919-1942

Records
Speed record: (3-year-olds)
 1 miles: 1:44 flat, Menow (1938)
 1 miles: 1:50 3/5, Loyal Legion (1947)

Speed record: (2-year-olds)
 1 mile: 1:39 1/5, Be Frank (1918) 

Most wins by a jockey:
 2 - Clarence Kummer (1915, 1920)
 2 - Andy Schuttinger (1917, 1922)
 2 - Clarence Kummer  (1921, 1931)
 2 - Albert Snider (1946, 1947)

Most wins by a trainer:
 2 - Clyde S. Phillips (1916, 1930)
 2 - Thomas J. Healey (1925, 1936)
 2 - Bud Stotler (1934, 1935)
 2 - James Radney (1946, 1948)

Most wins by an owner:
 2 - Willis Sharpe Kilmer (1928, 1933)
 2 - Alfred G. Vanderbilt II (1934, 1935)
 2 - Mrs. Ellsworth H. Augustus (1946, 1948)

Winners

References
 New York Times article on the 1921 Potomac Handicap

Horse races in Maryland
Discontinued horse races
Laurel Park Racecourse
Pimlico Race Course
Havre de Grace Racetrack
1914 establishments in Maryland
1948 disestablishments in Maryland
Recurring sporting events established in 1914
Recurring sporting events disestablished in 1948